Fatehpur Sikri railway station is a small railway station in Agra district, Uttar Pradesh. Its code is FTS. It serves Fatehpur Sikri city. The station consists of two platforms. The platforms are not well sheltered. It lacks many facilities including water and sanitation.

Trains 
Some of the trains that run through Fatehpur Sikri are:
 Haldighati Passenger
 Avadh Express
 Agra Fort–Kota Passenger 
 Bayana–Yamuna Bridge Agra Passenger 
 Agra Cantt–Bayana MEMU

References

Railway stations in Agra district
Agra railway division